The Mid Cork Junior A Football Championship (known for sponsorship reasons as the Ross Oil Junior A Football Championship) is an annual Gaelic football competition organised by the Muskerry Board of the Gaelic Athletic Association since 1926 for junior Gaelic football teams in the Muskerry region in County Cork, Ireland.

The series of games begin in April, with the championship culminating with the final in the autumn. The championship includes a knock-out stage and a "back door" for teams defeated in the first round.

The Mid Cork Junior Championship is an integral part of the wider Cork Junior Football Championship. The winners and runners-up of the Mid Cork championship join their counterparts from the other seven divisions to contest the county championship.

12 clubs currently participate in the Mid Cork Championship. The title has been won at least once by 18 different clubs. The all-time record-holders are Canovee, who have won a total of 16 titles. 

Kilmurry are the current title-holders after defeating Aghinagh in the 2022 championship final by 3-10 to 1-08.

Teams

2023 Teams

Roll of honour

List of Finals

Records

By decade

The most successful team of each decade, judged by number of Mid Cork Junior Football Championship titles, is as follows:

 1920s: 1 each for Macroom (1926), Ballincollig (1927), Naomh Abán (1928) and Iveleary (1929)
 1930s: 5 for Ballincollig (1930-33-36-37-38)
 1940s: 5 for Canovee (1943-46-47-48-49)
 1950s: 3 each for Canovee (1950-55-57) and Kilmichael (1953-56-59)
 1960s: 3 for Canovee (1961-62-68)
 1970s: 3 for Naomh Abán (1970-71-73)
 1980s: 3 for Kilmurry (1980-84-86)
 1990s: 3 for Ballinora (1990-96-97)
 2000s: 3 for Grenagh (2000-01-06)
 2010s: 4 for Kilmurry (2012-14-16-17)

Gaps

Top ten longest gaps between successive championship titles:
 55 years: Blarney (1954-2009)
 46 years: Macroom (1945-1991)
 39 years: Naomh Abán (1928-1967)
 38 years: Kilmurry (1931-1969)
 32 years: Éire Óg (1976-2008)
 31 years: Donoughmore (1952-1983)
 30 years: Iveleary (1985-2015)
 27 years: Béal Átha'n Ghaorthaidh (1965-1992)
 27 years: Iveleary (1958-1985)
 26 years: Kilmichael (1987-2013)
 26 years: Kilmurry (1986-2012)

2022 Championship

Group stage 
Group 1

Group 2

Group 3

Group 4

Knockout stage

See also
 Mid Cork Junior A Hurling Championship

External links
 Muskerry GAA website

Mid Cork Junior A Football Championship